Osteoglossidae is a family of large freshwater fish, which includes the arowanas and arapaima. The family contains two subfamilies Arapaiminae and Osteoglossinae, with a total of five living genera.

Osteoglossids are basal teleosts that originated some time during the Cretaceous, and are placed in the actinopterygiid order Osteoglossiformes. As traditionally defined, the family includes several extant species from South America, one from Africa, one from Asia, and two from Australia.

References

Osteoglossidae
Ray-finned fish families